Felke is a surname. Notable people with the surname include:

Aloys Felke (1927–1997), German politician and furniture manufacturer
Emanuel Felke (1856–1926), German protestant pastor and naturopath
Günter Felke (1929–2005), German furniture manufacturer, numismatist and patron of culture
Michael Felke (1895–1977), German furniture manufacturer
Petra Felke (born 1959), German track and field athlete

See also 
Felke Möbelwerke, German furniture factory